Malcolm Stevenson Forbes (August 19, 1919 – February 24, 1990) was an American entrepreneur and politician most prominently known as the publisher of Forbes magazine, founded by his father B. C. Forbes. He was known as an avid promoter of capitalism and free market economics and for an extravagant lifestyle, spending on parties, travel, and his collection of homes, yachts, aircraft, art, motorcycles, and Fabergé eggs. 

Forbes was also active in politics. He served two terms as a member of the New Jersey Senate representing Somerset County and ran two campaigns for Governor of New Jersey. In 1953, he lost the Republican nomination to Paul L. Troast, who had the support of most of the party establishment. In 1957, he was nominated but lost to incumbent Governor Robert Meyner.

Life and career
Forbes was born on August 19, 1919, in Englewood, New Jersey, the son of Adelaide Mary (Stevenson) and Scottish-born financial journalist and author B. C. Forbes. He graduated from The Lawrenceville School in 1937. In 1941 he received an A.B. from the School of Public and International Affairs, now Princeton School of Public and International Affairs, at Princeton University, with a 176-page senior thesis, "Weekly Newspapers - An Evaluation." Forbes enlisted in the Army in 1942 and served as a machine gunner in the 84th Infantry Division in Europe, rising to the rank of staff sergeant.  Forbes received a thigh wound in combat, and received a Bronze Star and a Purple Heart.

After dabbling in politics, including service in the New Jersey Senate from 1951 to 1957 and an unsuccessful candidacy for Governor of New Jersey, he committed himself full time to the magazine by 1957, three years after his father's death. After the death of his brother Bruce Charles Forbes in 1964, he acquired sole control of the company.

The magazine grew steadily, and Forbes diversified his investments into real estate sales and other ventures. One of his last projects was the magazine Egg, which chronicled New York's nightlife. (The title had nothing to do with Forbes's famous Fabergé egg collection.) To honor his contribution to the magazine, Forbes won the Walter Cronkite Award for Excellence in Journalism in 1989.

Forbes was an avid but idiosyncratic collector. In addition to a huge art collection and a collection of historical documents, he collected Harley-Davidson motorbikes and specially shaped hot air balloons. He owned more than 365 works by Peter Carl Fabergé, including a dozen Imperial eggs.

Malcolm Forbes' lavish lifestyle was exemplified by his private Capitalist Tool Boeing 727 trijet, ever-larger Highlander yachts, and his French Chateau (Château de Balleroy in Normandy) as well as his opulent birthday parties. In the mid 1960s he was a fixture at NYC's famous Cat Club on Wednesday nights, supporting local musical talent.

He chose the Mendoub Palace (which he had acquired from the Moroccan government in 1970) in the northwestern city of Tangier, Morocco, to host his 70th birthday party. Spending an estimated $2.5 million, he chartered a Boeing 747, a Douglas DC-8 and a Concorde to fly in eight hundred of the world's rich and famous from New York and London. The guests included his friend Elizabeth Taylor (who acted as a co-host), Gianni Agnelli, Robert Maxwell, Barbara Walters, Henry Kissinger, six U.S. state governors, and the CEOs of scores of multinational corporations likely to advertise in his magazine. The party entertainment was on a grand scale, including 600 drummers, acrobats and dancers and a fantasia—a cavalry charge ending with the firing of muskets into the air—by 300 Berber horsemen.  Party favors included a custom-engraved Rolex watch for each guest.

Forbes became a motorcyclist late in life. He founded and rode with a motorcycle club called the Capitalist Tools. His estate in New Jersey was a regular meeting place for tours that he organized for fellow New Jersey and New York motorcyclists. He had a stable of motorcycles but was partial to Harley-Davidson machines. He was known for his gift of Purple Passion, a Harley-Davidson, to actress Elizabeth Taylor. He was also instrumental in getting legislation passed to allow motorcycles on the Garden State Parkway in New Jersey.

Personal life
Forbes was married for thirty-nine years to Roberta Remsen Laidlaw before their divorce in 1985. The couple had five children: Malcolm S. Jr., Robert Laidlaw, Christopher Charles, Timothy Carter, and Moira Hamilton. Malcolm S. Forbes Jr., known as Steve, ran for president in 1996.

While living abroad, his father returned to Buchan, Aberdeenshire, every two years, staying in the Cruden Bay Hotel, "to entertain people of Whitehill to a picnic". It was a tradition revived by Malcolm in 1987.

In March 1990, soon after his death, OutWeek magazine published a story with the cover headline "The Secret Gay Life of Malcolm Forbes", by Michelangelo Signorile, which alleged Forbes was a gay man. Signorile was critical of the media for helping Forbes publicize many aspects of his life while keeping his homosexuality a secret. The writer asked, "Is our society so overwhelmingly repressive that even individuals as all-powerful as the late Malcolm Forbes feel they absolutely cannot come out of the
closet?"  Even in death, the media was reluctant to disclose his sexuality; The New York Times would refer only to him as a "famous, deceased millionaire" while reporting on the controversy.

Death and legacy
Forbes died in 1990 of a heart attack at age 70 at his home, Timberfield, in Far Hills, New Jersey. He was pronounced dead by his friend and physician Dr. Oscar Kruesi.

Since Malcolm Forbes's death, the magazine business has been run by his son Steve Forbes and granddaughter Moira Forbes.

Awards and honors
1942 - Bronze Star
1942 - Purple Heart
1949 - Freedoms Foundation Medal
1974 - Golden Plate Award of the American Academy of Achievement
1983 - Pride of Performance award given by the then President of Pakistan

Posthumous honors
 1999 - inducted into the Motorcycle Hall of Fame in 1999
 2008 - inducted into the New Jersey Hall of Fame

See also

 Forbes Galleries
 Forbes Museum of Tangier

References

Further reading

External links
 
 

1919 births
1990 deaths
20th-century American male writers
20th-century American non-fiction writers
20th-century American politicians
20th-century American LGBT people
American art collectors
American gay writers
American magazine editors
American magazine publishers (people)
American male non-fiction writers
American people of Scottish descent
American socialites
Malcolm
Harmon Trophy winners
Lawrenceville School alumni
American LGBT businesspeople
LGBT people from New Jersey
Motorcycling mass media people
Republican Party New Jersey state senators
People from Englewood, New Jersey
People from Far Hills, New Jersey
Politicians from Somerset County, New Jersey
Princeton School of Public and International Affairs alumni
Recipients of the Pride of Performance
United States Army personnel of World War II
United States Army soldiers